Sinéad O’Donnell (born 11 September 1975, Dublin) is an Irish artist. She currently lives and works in Belfast and travels extensively with her work.

Artistic Practice & Background
Sinéad's practice is performance based and site/context responsive, having worked across the mediums of performance, installation & time based art and studied sculpture at the University of Ulster, textiles in Dublin and visual performance and time-based practices at Dartington College of Arts.

'Her work explores identity, borders and barriers through encounters with territory and the territorial. She sets up actions or situations that demonstrate complexities, contradictions or commonality between medium and discipline, timing and spontaneity, intuition and methodology, artist and audience. She uses photography, video, text and collage to record her performances which often reveals an ongoing interest in the co-existence of other women and systems of kinship and identity. Sinéad’s practice is nomadic and travel has broadened her cultural perceptions and influenced her artistic sensibilities regarding time and space. '

Sinéad is a member of Bbeyond and active within the Belfast performance art scene where she works with a range of organisations to develop and disseminate performance art and support emerging artists working in the medium.

Sinéad was a 2010/11 ArtsAdmin bursary recipient during which time she focused on areas of her practice addressing disability, community and collaboration, including the development of CAUTION project.

Projects

CAUTION Project

CAUTION was an Unlimited commission as part of the London 2012 Cultural Olympiad. The project was financially supported by the National Lottery and delivered in partnership between London 2012, Arts Council England, the Scottish Arts Council, Arts Council of Wales, Arts Council of Northern Ireland and the British Council. CAUTION brought together the artists Sylvette Babin, Mariel Carranza, Paul Couillard, Poshya Kakil, Shiro Masuyama and Sinéad O’Donnell to re-frame their artistic identities within a discourse of invisible disability.

During 2011, Sinéad visited each artist and worked with them to produce material that explored invisibility, materiality and states in-between. The process was cumulative and each artist built upon ideas generated by previous encounters and journeys with Sinéad, connecting the artists and acting as a catalyst for the progression of the work.

Through this series of meetings, actions and correspondences across continents, CAUTION navigated between the national and international, the personal and political, the structured and the shattered, to give the artists space to explore their limits, break through boundaries and work with the extremes of their abilities to communicate and make things happen.

PAVES

Initiated by artist Anne Bean PAVES was a collaborative project between artists Anne Bean, Sinead O'Donnell, Poshya Kakl, Efi Ben-David and Vlasta Delimar, which aimed to reflect on how "intense, wider political context inevitably sculpts work". The project aimed to use dialogue and debate to develop trust and understanding between communities, whilst enriching the cultural landscape of Europe and its surrounding nations.

Seminal Works

'Violent' performance series

The violent performance series began at Red Ape in Plymouth curated by Mark Greenwood for the fringe event to Marina Abramović's 'The pigs of today are the hams of tomorrow'. Throughout this series of works Sinéad used the sound of the word as opposite to the actual physical threat of violence. By 2013 she had unravelled her relationship with the subject to the point where sound was no longer necessary to articulate her ideas. The series is a leading example of her 'process led' practice and how she opens up this process to her audiences.

erasing HER history

Areas of Specific Interest

For an in depth overview of Sinéad's practice please read Gillian Wylde's 'A response to the work of Sinead O'Donnell by Gillian Wylde' in which she states "O’Donnell’s work is for and about breaking things up, agency and transmission, waiting, giving way. This is purposelessly purposeful work, contradictory, simple, hard. If you do something on purpose (not by accident), you do it purposely. But if you have a specific purpose in mind, you are acting purposefully. Much in life is done or made with no discernible point or purpose. Much in life is done with great purposefulness, endlessly the same and endlessly different."

Exhibition History
Sinéad has presented work extensively including: In Between Time, Bristol (2013), RITES, Singapore (2012), Mobius Performance Space, Boston, USA (2012), Southbank Centre, London (2012) Golden Thread Gallery, Belfast (2012), Contemporary Art Factory, Tokyo, Japan (2011), My Land festival, Croatia (2012), Black Market International, Belfast (2012), National Review of Live Art, Glasgow (2010). For further details please see her curriculum vitae.

References

Feminist artists
Women performance artists
Irish performance artists
Irish women artists
1975 births
Living people